Stanisław Jan Pięta (born 9 May 1971 in Bielsko-Biała) is a Polish politician. He was elected to the Sejm on 25 September 2005, getting 7,240 votes in 27 Bielsko-Biała district as a candidate from the Law and Justice list.

He is married with a child. In 2018, Pięta was accused of seducing a young woman, whom he later abandoned. He was removed from the Sejm group and two commissions.

See also
Members of Polish Sejm 2005-2007

References

External links
Stanisław Pięta - parliamentary page - includes declarations of interest, voting record, and transcripts of speeches.

1971 births
Living people
People from Bielsko-Biała
Members of the Polish Sejm 2005–2007
Law and Justice politicians
Members of the Polish Sejm 2007–2011
Members of the Polish Sejm 2011–2015